Brigadier General Arthur George Preston McNalty,  (1871–1958) was a British Army field commander of both the Second Boer War and the First World War.

Military career
McNalty was commissioned a second lieutenant on 3 August 1901. He saw active service in South Africa during the Second Boer War (1899–1902), for which he received the Queen's South Africa Medal (campaign medal) with 5 battle clasps. Attached to the Army Service Corps, he was promoted to lieutenant on 3 August 1902, while still in South Africa. McNalty served thereafter with the British Army of Occupation in Egypt from 1911 to 1914. Arthur McNalty served, finally, from 1914 to 1919 during WWI in Egypt, Turkey (during the Dardanelles Campaign or Battle of Gallipoli) and France, during which he had 6 combat despatches and completed his service as a Brigadier General or Brigadier (in field command, a commander of a brigade or three battalions, that is approximately 3000 troops). In France, Arthur McNalty was severely wounded. McNalty, subsequently, acted as Director General of grave registrations and enquiries from 1919 and until his retirement from service in the British Armed Forces in 1920.

Family

Wife and children
Arthur McNalty married in 1905 Margaret Maude de Windt, but they divorced in 1921. There were two children of the marriage:
Frances Joy St. George McNalty (b. 1907)
Peter Geoffrey Bourchier McNalty (b. 1909).

Father
Arthur McNalty's father, British Army brigade surgeon Lt. Col. George William McNalty, MD, LRCSI, FRCSI, CB (1837–1912) invented (1873) the "iron wire folding fracture box" or splint, which was intended for use on the battlefield and in mass casualty situations and which foreshadowed the German surgeon Friedrich Cramer's (1847–1903) later invention of the Cramer wire ladder splint or the malleable wire ladder splint, which was developed for the same purposes and which is still used widely to this day individually or in multiple for emergency splint of fractured limbs. The Lieutenant Colonel served with the British Ambulance Service during the Franco-Prussian War and also served in the Ashanti War (1873–74), the Russo-Turkish War, the Second Anglo-Afghan War, and the Anglo-Egyptian War. He was the Honorary Surgeon to the Viceroy of India. He retired from the British Army in 1892.

Sisters
George William McNalty's daughter and Arthur George McNalty's sister, Elizabeth Ann McNulty, was the wife of the Irish surgeon Andrew Sexton Gray, who is known as the "founder of ophthalmology in Australia". An infant sister Georgina Lucy McNalty died on 15 September 1875.

See also
List of British generals and brigadiers
British Army officer rank insignia "Brigadier Generals wore a crossed sword and baton symbol on its own. In 1922 the rank was replaced with Colonel-Commandant, a title that reflected the role more accurately, but which many considered to be inappropriate in a British context. From 1928 the latter was replaced with the rank of Brigadier with the rank insignia used to this day.”

References

1871 births
1958 deaths
British Army generals
British Army personnel of the Second Boer War
British Army personnel of World War I
Companions of the Order of St Michael and St George
Commanders of the Order of the British Empire
Royal Army Service Corps officers
British Yeomanry soldiers